Mohamed Nizam (born 17 May 1974) is a Maldivian former footballer who played as a forward. He was the captain of the Maldives national football team and now retired from international football.

Career statistics

Managerial

External links

Honours 

1974 births
Living people
Maldivian footballers
Maldives international footballers
New Radiant S.C. players
Club Valencia players
People from Thoddoo
Association football forwards